Steven Cousins (born 24 May 1972) is a British former competitive men's singles figure skater. He is the 1993 Skate Canada International bronze medalist and an eight-time British national champion. He finished as high as 6th at the Olympics (1998), 7th at the World Championships (1998), and 4th at the European Championships (1996).

Career 
Cousins began skating in 1978 after he and his brother pushed their parents to take them to an ice rink. Although he had a negative reaction at first ("We ended up going to the rink, and I hated it"), he eventually grew interested in figuring out how to jump and spin. He was also spurred on by sibling rivalry with his elder brother.

Cousins is the youngest skater to win the British National Championships. He trained with Donna Gately at Deeside Ice Rink in the United Kingdom and then moved to the United States where he spent a number of years. In 1993, he moved to Canada and was coached by Doug Leigh at the Mariposa School of Skating in Barrie, Ontario. He also worked with Stephen Pickavance and Karen Barber in the UK.

Cousins competed at three Winter Olympics, nine World Championships, and nine European Championships during his career. He became the first Briton to land a triple Axel in competition at the 1994 Winter Olympics in Lillehammer, Norway. He was the British national champion for seven consecutive years before his streak was interrupted by Neil Wilson in the 1996–97 season. Cousins finished higher at the 1997 European Championships and was sent to the 1997 World Championships.

Cousins reclaimed his national title in the 1997–98 season. After finishing ninth at the 1997 Nations Cup, he withdrew from the 1997 Trophée Lalique. He placed sixth at the 1998 Winter Olympics in Nagano, Japan. He was coached by Doug Leigh and Robert Tebby.

Cousins retired from eligible competition in 1998 but continued to skate in shows, including touring with Stars on Ice until 2007. He has worked as a choreographer. In May 2010, he joined the International Skating School at Planet Ice, Coventry, and Silver Blades, Altrincham. He was the event manager for the 2012–13 Disson skating shows.

Personal life 
Cousins was born on 24 May 1972 in Chester, England. He married Canadian ice dancer Kristina Lenko in June 2003. They formally separated in the summer of 2006 and subsequently divorced. With former wife Elena Berezhnaya, he has two children, a son Trystan, born on 6 October 2007, and daughter Sofia Diana, born on 21 June 2009. The couple's separation was confirmed in August 2013.

Cousins has a home in Chester but lives more than half the year in Ontario, Canada.

Programmes

Competitive highlights 
GP: Champions Series (Grand Prix)

References 

1972 births
Sportspeople from Chester
British male single skaters
English male single skaters
Olympic figure skaters of Great Britain
Figure skaters at the 1992 Winter Olympics
Figure skaters at the 1994 Winter Olympics
Figure skaters at the 1998 Winter Olympics
Living people
Competitors at the 1998 Goodwill Games